Granville is a ghost town in Angelina County, in the U.S. state of Texas. It is located within the Lufkin, Texas micropolitan area.

History
Granville had a church and a few houses in the 1930s then had a cemetery and a few scattered houses in the early 1990s.

Geography

Education
Today, the ghost town is located within the Hudson Independent School District.

See also
List of ghost towns in Texas

References

Geography of Angelina County, Texas
Ghost towns in East Texas